Mother Teresa of Calcutta is a 2003 biographical television film based on the life of Mother Teresa, the founder of the Missionaries of Charity religious institute. The film stars Olivia Hussey in the title role and received a CAMIE award in 2007. The film was originally produced as the Italian television miniseries Madre Teresa.

Cast information
 Olivia Hussey as Mother Teresa
 Sebastiano Somma as Father Serrano: a Vatican priest sent to evaluate Mother Teresa's application for the founding of the Missionaries of Charity. Initially sceptical, he eventually becomes a follower of Mother Teresa.
 Michael Mendl as Celeste van Exem: Mother Teresa's long-time spiritual director.
 Laura Morante as Mother Cenacle
 Ingrid Rubio as Sister Agnes/Virginia
 Guillermo Ayesa as Perier
 Valeria Cavalli as Drane
 Enzo De Caro as Enzo Decaro
 Morgane Slemp as Silvia
 Antonia Frering as Sister Stephanie
 Emily Hamilton as Anna
 Ravindra Randeniya as Police Chief
 Daya Alwis as Kaligarth seller
 W. Jayasiri as Mr. Goma

See also
 Mother Teresa: In the Name of God's Poor, 1997 film.

References

External links
 Mother Teresa (2003). A review of the film by Steven D. Greydanus, originally published in National Catholic Register.

2003 films
Biographical television films
Films shot in Sri Lanka
Films set in India
Cultural depictions of Mother Teresa
Films about Nobel laureates
Films set in Vatican City
Films set in Kolkata
Films set in the 1940s
Films about Catholicism
Films about Christianity
Christianity in India